Stelis vegrandis is a species of orchid plant native to Ecuador.

References 

vegrandis
Flora of Ecuador